Ikarchala railway station is a halt railway station on Katihar–Siliguri branch of Howrah–New Jalpaiguri line in the Katihar railway division of Northeast Frontier Railway zone. Ikarchala railway station serves  Goalpokhar I block and surrounding areas.

References

Railway stations in Uttar Dinajpur district
Katihar railway division